Bovirdeh (also Romanized as Bovīrdeh and Boveyr Deh; also known as Bavāredeh and Bwairda) is a village in Abdoliyeh-ye Sharqi Rural District, in the Central District of Ramshir County, Khuzestan Province, Iran. At the 2006 census, its population was 59, in 12 families.

References 

Populated places in Ramshir County